Jasenie is a village and municipality in Brezno District, in the Banská Bystrica Region of central Slovakia.

History
In historical records, the village was first mentioned in 1424 (1424 Jechene, 1455 Jezen, 1465 Jassena, 1512 Jesene), as belonging to Slovenská Ľupča town.

Genealogical resources

The records for genealogical research are available at the state archive "Statny Archiv in Banska Bystrica, Slovakia"

 Roman Catholic church records (births/marriages/deaths): 1673-1896 (parish B)
 Lutheran church records (births/marriages/deaths): 1784-1927 (parish B)

See also
 List of municipalities and towns in Slovakia

References

External links
https://web.archive.org/web/20071027094149/http://www.statistics.sk/mosmis/eng/run.html.  
http://www.e-obce.sk/obec/jasenie/jasenie.html
Surnames of living people in Jasenie

Villages and municipalities in Brezno District